The Attorney General's Department is a non-ministerial government department in Sri Lanka that supports the attorney general and his/her deputy the solicitor general. The department is headed by the attorney general and comes under the purview of the Ministry of Justice. The office of "Attorney General" was formally adopted in the year 1884.

Operational functions
Attorney General's Department provides legal assistance to the Central Government, Provincial Councils, Government Departments, Statutory Boards and other Semi Government institutions. Legal officers of the Department provide instructions to the Government and Governmental Institutions on Civil, Criminal, Constitutional and Commercial matters and represent the Government and Governmental Institutions for the Cases, instituted in the Supreme Court, other Courts and labor tribunals in the Island.

Organisation
Three main Divisions named Civil Division, Criminal Division and State Attorney Division have been established in the Department for Civil and Criminal Cases and the Establishment Division & Account Division have been established to conduct administrative work. In addition to those divisions, Corporation Division, EER Unit, which performs duties under Extra Emergency Regulations and Prevention of Terrorism Act, Child Abuse Cases Unit, Immigration & Emigration Unit, Public Petitions Unit and Supreme Court Unit have been established for the smooth functioning of the Attorney General's Department.

Current attorney general 
As of May 2021, Sanjay Rajaratnam is the current attorney general of Sri Lanka, he was appointed by the Parliamentary Council approved, replacing the previous AG Dappula de Livera.

Organizational structure
Lawyers' of the Attorney General's Department are known as the Law Officers.
 Attorney General (AG)
 Solicitor General (SG)
 Senior Additional Solicitors General (SASG)
 Additional Solicitors General (ASG)
 Senior Deputy Solicitors General (SDSG)
 Deputy Solicitors General (DSG)
 Senior State Counsel
 State Counsel
 Assistant State Counsel
 Senior State Attorney
 State Attorney
 Senior Assistant State Attorney
 Assistant State Attorney

Former posts
 Senior Crown Counsel – replaced by Senior State Counsel
 Crown Counsel – replaced by State Counsel
 Crown Proctor – replaced by State Attorney

See also
Attorney General of Sri Lanka
Solicitor General of Sri Lanka
Unofficial Bar

External links and references
Attorney General's Department

References

A
Law of Sri Lanka